The  is an electric multiple unit (EMU) limited express train type operated by the private railway operator Keihan Electric Railway in Japan since 2008.

Formations 
, the fleet consists of six eight-car trains (3001 to 3006), formed as follows with three motored ("M") cars and five non-powered trailer ("T") cars.

As built (October 2008 – January 2021)

Sets with a Premium Car (January 2021 – present)
Sets with a Premium Car are formed as follows.

The Mc and M cars are each equipped with one single-arm pantograph.

Interior

Standard cars 
Passenger accommodation consists of 2+1 abreast transverse seating, with longitudinal seating at the car ends. Each car has priority seating and a wheelchair space. LCD information displays are featured above each door.

Premium Car 
Passenger accommodation for the Premium Car consists of twelve rows of 2+1 abreast reclining seats, and four additional reclining seats, for a total of 40 seats. Wheelchair accommodation is provided.

History 
The 3000 series trains were introduced into service on 19 October 2008, coinciding with at the opening of the Keihan Nakanoshima Line. It was initially used on most service patterns, but later was redeployed on limited express services.

The trains received the Laurel Prize in 2009.

Premium Car introduction 
From 31 January 2021, all sets' sixth cars were replaced in service with newly built Premium Cars at a total cost of 1.2 billion yen. The new cars allow premium services to be provided on all daytime express trains. While the outgoing cars' future was undecided at the time, it was confirmed that they will not be scrapped.

The 3000 series' Premium Cars share some attributes with those of the 8000 series fleet, such as the golden passenger door on each side and Nanoe X air purifiers. They also feature compact "Infoverre Window Series Bar Type" external LCD destination displays.

The introduction of the Premium Cars led to the 3000 series receiving the Laurel Prize again in 2022, with the Japan Railfan Club citing the cars' "high degree of perfection".

References

External links

  

Electric multiple units of Japan
3000 series
Train-related introductions in 2008
Kawasaki multiple units
1500 V DC multiple units of Japan